Billa Barra Hill is a   Local Nature Reserve north of Stanton under Bardon in Leicestershire. It is owned and managed by Hinckley and Bosworth Borough Council.

The top of the hill is a former quarry, leaving exposed rocks which provide a habitat for a variety of mosses and lichens. Lower down there are areas of acid grassland, and locally sourced trees have been planted on the lower slopes.

There is access from Billa Barra Lane.

References

Local Nature Reserves in Leicestershire